Charles Rollo Peters (April 10, 1862 – March 2, 1928) was an American oil painter of nocturnes.

Early life
Peters was born on April 10, 1862, in San Francisco, California. He studied at the Académie Julian and the École des Beaux-Arts in Paris, France; where he was a student of Jean-Léon Gérôme, Gustave Boulanger, and Jules Joseph Lefebvre.

Career
In the mid 1890s, Peters opened a studio in Monterey, California, where he became an oil painter of nocturnes scenes of the Carmel Mission, adobes, cypress trees, and the coast. He was a member of the Bohemian Club. According to the San Francisco Examiner, he became "one of the world's greatest artists." For the Los Angeles Times, he was "known internationally for his nocturne studies of Californian and European subjects."

Peters resided in Monterey with his second wife, who was a painter. In 1900, he bought   of land where he built a home and studio, called "Peters Gate," designed by architect Willis Polk.

His son,  was also a painter. His son, Charles Rollo Peter (commonly known as Rollo Peters), was an actor, theatre director, and scenic designer.

Death
Peters died on March 2, 1928, in San Francisco, at age 66. His work is in the permanent collection of the Laguna Art Museum in Laguna Beach, California.

References

 

1862 births
1928 deaths
Artists from San Francisco
People from Monterey, California
Académie Julian alumni
American alumni of the École des Beaux-Arts
American male painters
19th-century American painters
19th-century American male artists
20th-century American painters
20th-century American male artists